Falling Into Place is the third solo studio album by New Zealand rapper David Dallas. The album was released through Dawn Raid Entertainment, Dirty Records and Duck Down Music Inc. on 18 October 2013. The album debuted at #2 on the New Zealand albums chart.

Singles 

The first track released off Falling Into Place was "My Mentality", featuring American rapper Freddie Gibbs, released in August 2013. The first official single was "Runnin, released on August 27, 2013. It peaked at #7 in the New Zealand singles chart and was certified Platinum on January 10, 2014 by Recorded Music NZ. The second single  released was  "The Wire", featuring  Ruby Frost, which peaked at #11 in the New Zealand singles chart and was certified Gold on Feb 7th 2014 by Recorded Music NZ.

Track listing

Chart performance

Release history

References 

2013 albums
David Dallas albums
Duck Down Music albums